Douglas Rodger Naylor (born 31 December 1955) is an English comedy writer, science fiction writer, director and television producer.

Life and career
Naylor was born in Manchester, Lancashire, England, and studied at Chetham's School of Music and the University of Liverpool. In the mid-1980s Naylor created and wrote two comedy sketch shows for BBC Radio 4 entitled Cliché and Son of Cliché, as well as two sitcoms,Wrinkles and Wally Who? for the same station. These shows were scripted by Naylor along with another writer, Rob Grant.  This writing partnership was successful, with Grant and Naylor going on to co-write and produce numerous British radio and television series throughout the 1980s and 1990s, including programmes such as The Cannon and Ball Show, A Kick Up The Eighties, Three of A Kind, Comic Relief, Spitting Image and they wrote the singles, Father Christmas is on the Dole which charted in 1986 and The Chicken Song which was No. 1 in the charts for three weeks (1986). They created the sitcomThe 10 Percenters which was awarded "Best ITV Sitcom" at the 1996 British Comedy Awards for the second series after Grant had left the partnership. 

The collaborations between Grant and Naylor have often used the pseudonym Grant Naylor. Together, they wrote the British science fiction comedy television series Red Dwarf under this name. Their earlier radio sketch shows formed the basis for the show; Chris Barrie starred in both of these, as well as Red Dwarf.

In 1994, an episode of Red Dwarf from the sixth series, Gunmen of the Apocalypse, won an International Emmy Award in the Popular Arts category, and in the same year the series was also awarded 'Best BBC Comedy Series' at the British Comedy Awards. The series attracted its highest ratings, of over eight million viewers, during the eighth series in 1999.

Some time between the airing of the sixth series of Red Dwarf in 1993, and the writing of the seventh series in 1996, Grant ended his partnership with Naylor after revealing he was tired of it and that he intended to quit and pursue other projects. The pair announced their professional split and cited creative and professional differences, along with Grant's desire to move into new areas.

With this split, it appeared as though Red Dwarf was finished; other obstacles included the fact that Chris Barrie was tied up starring in The Brittas Empire and the other star of Red Dwarf, Craig Charles, was in prison awaiting trial. However, when Charles was acquitted and Barrie became available for a few episodes, a seventh series finally went ahead. Naylor went on to write the seventh and eighth series of Red Dwarf mostly on his own (70% of the series, by his own estimate), although some episodes were co-written with Paul Alexander and Kim Fuller, and one episode co-written with one of the cast members, Robert Llewellyn.

Naylor is the author of a Red Dwarf novel: Last Human (1995). He also wrote Primordial Soup (1993), Son of Soup (1996) and Red Dwarf VII: The Official Book (1999).

In 2007, Naylor and Grant Naylor Productions were primarily focused on the production of the DVD releases of Red Dwarf and the postulated movie. In 2008 it was announced by Grant Naylor Productions that Red Dwarf would return to television in the form of four half-hour specials for the UKTV Network channel Dave. The episodes were broadcast over the Easter weekend of 2009, and comprising a three-part special (20 minutes each), "Back to Earth", and a behind-the-scenes 'Making of' special. Naylor wrote the scripts for the three new episodes and also directed them. "Back to Earth" received record ratings for the Dave channel.

In 2011, Dave commissioned Naylor to write and direct a new six episode series of Red Dwarf, later entitled Red Dwarf XI. The series won the Royal Television Society's award for Best Special Effects, presented in 2013.

Naylor formed Three Feet Productions in October 2017 with his son Richard and wrote and directed a one-off comedy for BBC One , entitled Over To Bill, starring Hugh Dennis, Neil Morrissey, Tracy Ann Oberman and Helen George and produced by Richard Naylor.

In 20152016, Naylor wrote and directed 12 more episodes of Red Dwarf for Dave). Red Dwarf XI was broadcast from September 2016 onwards, and Red Dwarf XII from September 2017. Both series were a Baby Cow Productions commission, with Richard Naylor and Kerry Waddell as producers. 

In 2020 Red Dwarf: The Promised Land, a 90 minute TV Special was again written and directed by Naylor for Dave and was a Baby Cow Production, with Richard Naylor as Producer. Naylor has now written or co-written all 74 episodes of Red Dwarf and was Executive Producer on 51 episodes.

Personal life
Naylor is married with two sons, one of whom (Richard) is a television writer and producer, the other a doctor. Naylor has a prosthetic leg due to a road accident when he was seven years old, hence the naming of his and Richard's production company ‘Three Feet Productions’

Writing credits

Bibliography
Red Dwarf (1989), with Rob Grant - published under the joint pseudonym Grant Naylor, and sometimes credited as Red Dwarf: Infinity Welcomes Careful Drivers or just Infinity Welcomes Careful Drivers.
Better Than Life (1990), with Rob Grant - published under the joint pseudonym Grant Naylor.
Last Human (1995), a sequel to Better Than Life.

References

External links
 Interview (December 2007)
 
 

1955 births
Living people
English comedy writers
English science fiction writers
English television writers
Writers from Manchester
Alumni of the University of Liverpool